The T-Mobile myTouch 4G Slide is a touchscreen slider smartphone designed and manufactured by HTC Corporation for T-Mobile USA's "myTouch" series of phones.  It is the fourth of the myTouch family. The myTouch 4G Slide is the first myTouch to feature HTC Espresso 3.0, a graphical user interface similar to HTC Sense 3.0. Highlights include an 8-megapixel camera, the Genius Button, and a hardware keyboard.

The myTouch 4G Slide was unveiled on the T-Mobile website on July 11, 2011. Pre-orders began on July 14, 2011, and the phone was launched on July 26.

History

Development 

During development, the myTouch 4G Slide was known as the "HTC Doubleshot", which was leaked to the public as the phone's official name.

Release 

The myTouch 4G Slide was released to the United States on July 26, 2011 through T-Mobile USA. The phone confirmed rumors written in multiple blogs.

Design 

The design of the myTouch 4G Slide is a refinement of that of the myTouch 4G. From the front, the phones look similar; the main differences between the two are small changes to the four physical buttons and a slightly smaller screen (the myTouch 4G Slide has a 3.7-inch screen, and the myTouch 4G a 3.8-inch screen). The backs of the phones, however, are noticeably different. The myTouch 4G Slide is thicker than the myTouch 4G due to the Slide's physical keyboard, which is not present on the myTouch 4G.

Hardware

Physical keyboard and input

The myTouch 4G Slide stands out amongst other Android handsets because of its uncommon physical slide-out four-row keyboard.  The Keyboard is backlighted when the Ambient Light Sensor detects low light, but this leaves the keyboard hard to see in many common situations.  An aftermarket app called Tasker includes control to force the keyboard backlight to stay on.

The phone has four physical keys on the front: Home, Menu, Back, and the Genius Button; along with an optical trackpad. "Genius" is a custom voice command and text-to-speech system powered by Dragon Dictation technologies. The Genius Button replaces the Search button from the myTouch 3G. On the sides, the phone has its camera and volume adjustment buttons. On the top, the phone has its lock/power button.

Screen 

The myTouch 4G Slide has a 3.7", 480-by-800 pixel, WVGA Super LCD touchscreen. The multi-touch display is designed to be used with either a bare finger or multiple fingers.

Processor and memory 

The myTouch 4G Slide features a 1.2 GHz dual-core Snapdragon S3 (Adreno 220 GPU) processor and 768 MB RAM, and supports up to a 32 GB MicroSD card (an 8 GB card typically comes with the phone).

Cameras 

The myTouch 4G Slide features a rear-facing 8-megapixel camera capable of recording 1080p video at 30 frames per second, with a dual flash that helps illuminate objects in low-light conditions. The built-in camera software comes with features including Sweepshot, Burstshot, HDR (high dynamic range), and zero shutter lag. In addition, the myTouch 4G Slide has a VGA camera on the front of the device designed for video calls and self-portraits; it is allowed to be used by other applications.

The camera has been highly praised by various reviewers. Notably, the technology blog Gizmodo suggested that the myTouch 4G Slide's camera was "the best camera phone ever".

Battery and power 

The device comes pre-installed with a 1520 mAh Li-ion rechargeable battery designed to be user-replaceable. Battery life is stated to be 12.4 days in standby using HSPA+ and 9.8 days in 2G, with a talk time of 6.9 hours (HSPA+) or 8.9 hours (2G).

Interface

A modified HTC Sense 3.0 user interface was added to the 4G Slide. Some differences in the Sense modification include a different screen bottom designed specifically for 4G slide, and having only 5 desktop screens instead of the original 7.

Alternative firmware

There is an unofficial port of CyanogenMod 11.0 (Android 4.4.2) for the device; the CyanogenMod development team is making efforts towards official inclusion in the list of supported devices. Various other mods and firmware releases also exist.

Networks

The device features quad-band (850/900/1800/1900) GSM connectivity for 2G networks. For HSPA+ UMTS bands I, II and IV are supported, providing speeds up to 21.1 Mbit/s download and 5.76 Mbit/s upload.

See also
 List of Android devices
 Android (operating system)
 T-Mobile myTouch 4G
 Galaxy Nexus
 Trackpad

References

External links
 T-Mobile myTouch 4G Slide official website

Mobile phones introduced in 2011
Android (operating system) devices
Smartphones
Mobile phones with an integrated hardware keyboard
MyTouch
T-Mobile myTouch 4G Slide